Dichelia histrionana is a species of moth of the family Tortricidae. It is found from Fennoscandia to Belgium, Italy and Greece and from the Netherlands to Poland and Romania.

The wingspan is 17–22 mm. Adults are on wing from the end of May to late August.

The larvae feed on Picea and Abies species. They live in the old needles of their host plant. A single larva mines a number of leaves, entering though a round opening, mostly in the base of the leaf. Mined needles are spun together. The frass is ejected. Often the larvae can be seen outside the mine, in the spinning. Older larvae live freely among spun needles. The species overwinters as a young larva in a mined needle. Larvae can be found from August to June of the following year. They are bright green with a chestnut to black head.

References

Moths described in 1828
Archipini
Moths of Europe